The 1975 Vanderbilt Commodores football team represented Vanderbilt University in the 1975 NCAA Division I football season.  The team was led by head coach Fred Pancoast, who replaced Steve Sloan.  In 1974, Sloan had led Vanderbilt to a bowl game for the first time since 1955, before leaving to become head coach at Texas Tech, the team Vanderbilt had faced in the Peach Bowl to close the season.  The Vanderbilt squad finished the season with a record of 7–4, but was not invited to a bowl game.  Three of the Commodores's four defeats came by margins of more than 30 points while all seven of their victors were by ten or fewer points.

Season
Vanderbilt defeated Rice, Tulane, Army, Kentucky, Virginia, and Tennessee.  The Commodores lost to Georgia, Alabama, Florida, and Ole Miss.  Vanderbilt started off with three wins and four losses before winning their last four games of the season including the regular season finale against rival Tennessee.  Vanderbilt's final record was 7–4 with a mark of 2–4 in the SEC.

Schedule

Team players drafted into the NFL

References

Vanderbilt
Vanderbilt Commodores football seasons
Vanderbilt Commodores football